Pyaar To Hona Hi Tha is a 1998 Indian romantic comedy film starring Ajay Devgn and Kajol. The film is a 
remake of the 1995 American film French Kiss starring Meg Ryan and Kevin Kline.

At the 44th Filmfare Awards, Pyaar To Hona Hi Tha received 5 nominations, including Best Film and Best Supporting Actor (Puri), and won Best Female Playback Singer (Jaspinder Narula for "Pyaar To Hona Hi Tha"). Moreover, Kajol also received a Best Actress nomination at the ceremony for her performance in the film, but instead won the award for her performance in Kuch Kuch Hota Hai.

Plot 
Sanjana (Kajol), an exceptionally clumsy woman, lives in Paris with her uncle (Harish Patel) and is about to marry her love, Rahul (Bijay Anand). Rahul is about to go to India on a business trip and Sanjana insists on going with him, even though she has an intense fear of flying. When the plane is ready to take off, Sanjana's fear gets the best of her and she creates havoc on the plane, managing to get herself off the aircraft safely. A few days later, during Rahul's daily phone call to Sanjana, he blurts out that he has fallen in love with Nisha (Kashmera Shah) and intends not to come back to Paris to marry Sanjana.

Sanjana decides to fly to India and get Rahul back whatever the cost, including overcoming her fear of flying. As the plane is about to take off, a passenger named Shekhar (Ajay Devgn) sits next to her. He realizes that Sanjana is scared of flying, so he diverts her attention by provoking her. During the flight, Sanjana accidentally spills a drink on Shekhar and realizes that he is hiding something. Shekhar goes to the toilet, and while inside he pulls a plant wrapped in cloth out of his pocket. He unwraps the cloth covering the plant, revealing a diamond necklace that he had stolen from Paris. After returning to his seat, he puts the necklace into one of Sanjana's bags in order to sneak it by customs. After a chaotic journey, the plane lands in India.

Sanjana's bags, however, are eventually stolen, and Shekhar decides to stay with her as a way of staying close to the necklace. Meanwhile, Police Inspector Khan (Om Puri) is after Shekhar for stealing the necklace. Shekhar and Sanjana end up in Shekhar's native village, where they participate in the festivities surrounding the wedding of Shekhar's sister, Chutki (Purnima Talwalkar). Shekhar falls in love with Sanjana but does not tell her. Meanwhile, Sanjana finds out that Shekhar wanted to earn money for the surgery of his nephew (Mohsin Memon), who needs a heart transplant. She tells him that she has had the diamond necklace all along, while Shekhar promises to help Sanjana find Rahul.

Rahul has gone to Palam Beach with Nisha, and Sanjana, still in love with Rahul, is determined to separate them. She and Shekhar go to Palam Beach and find Rahul and Nisha, and Shekhar pretends to be Sanjana's boyfriend to make Rahul jealous, all the while being careful not to reveal his true feelings to her. Sanjana, unfortunately, opts for another plot – acting as a rich heiress – and makes Rahul rethink his relationship with her. Shekhar and Sanjana are invited to Nisha's birthday party, where she announces that she and Rahul are engaged. Sanjana is shocked, and in a moment realizes that she has fallen for the brooding, intense Shekhar. However, she does not tell him, not knowing that he loves her as well.

One day, Inspector Khan finds Sanjana and tells her that Shekhar has stolen the necklace and that he wants it back without having to arrest him for theft. Sanjana, knowing how important the necklace is for Shekhar, gives it back to Inspector Khan but tells her boss in Paris to get all her francs, convert them to rupees, and give them to Shekhar. She then tells Shekhar that she sold the necklace and that she has decided to return to France. After Sanjana leaves, Inspector Khan tells Shekhar what Sanjana did for him, and he rushes off to the airport to tell Sanjana of his love. He manages to stop her flight from taking off. Shekhar tells Sanjana he loves her, and she tearfully confesses that she loves him too. The two embrace on the plane in front of the cheering passengers.

Cast 
Ajay Devgn as Shekhar Suryavanshi 
Kajol as Sanjana Suryavanshi 
Om Puri as Inspector Iftikhar Khan
Sunil Grover as Barber Gulshan Sharma
Vijay Anand as Rahul Bajaj, Sanjana's fiancé.
Kashmera Shah as Nisha Jaitley, Rahul's lover.
Harish Patel as Amrish Patel, Sanjana's uncle.
Reema Lagoo as Rukmini Suryavanshi, Vardaan's wife and Shekhar's sister-in-law.
Aanjjan Srivastav as Anupam Suryavanshi, Shekhar's father.
Tiku Talsania as Kumar Mangat / Sher Singh
Adi Irani as Receptionist at hotel
Brahmachari (actor) as Station master
Satish Kaul as Pankaj Jaitley, Nisha's father.
Mushtaq Khan as Thief
Ghanshyam Rohera as Ram Singh (assistant to Inspector Khan)
Purnima Talwalkar as Suhana Suryavanshi, Shekhar's sister
Mohsin Memon as Vijay Suryavanshi, Shekhar's nephew.
Asha Sharma as Somiksha Suryavanshi, Shekhar's mother.
Ashish Nagpal as Vardaan Suryavanshi, Shekhar's elder brother.
Shama Deshpande as Anita Jaitley, Nisha's mother.
Anupam Shyam as Robber at shop

Music

The album was released by Baba Music and was the fourth best selling album of 1998 after Kuch Kuch Hota Hai (also by Jatin–Lalit), Dil Se.. and Soldier. It received nominations at the Filmfare, Star Screen and Zee Cine Awards for Best Music Direction by Jatin–Lalit. The tracks "Pyar To Hona Hi Tha", "Aaj Hai Sagai", "Ajnabi Mujko Itna Bata" and "Jab Kisi Ki Taraf" were popular. The lyrics were written by Sameer, except for "Jab Kisiki Taraf Dil", whose lyrics were written by Vinoo Mahendra.

A guitar riff from Bryan Adams' "Have You Ever Really Loved A Woman?" was sampled in the title track.

Reception

Box office

The film was the third highest grosser of 1998 and was a super hit at the box office.

Accoldes

References

External links 
 

1998 films
Indian remakes of American films
1990s Hindi-language films
Films scored by Jatin–Lalit
Films directed by Anees Bazmee
Hindi remakes of English films
Films scored by Surinder Sodhi